The cakewalk was a dance developed from the "prize walks" (dance contests with a cake awarded as the prize) held in the mid-19th century, generally at get-togethers on Black slave plantations before and after emancipation in the Southern United States. Alternative names for the original form of the dance were "chalkline-walk", and the "walk-around". It was originally a processional partner dance danced with comical formality, and may have developed as a subtle mockery of the mannered dances of white slaveholders.

Following an exhibition of the cakewalk at the 1876 Centennial Exposition in Philadelphia, the cakewalk was adopted by performers in minstrel shows, where it was danced exclusively by men until the 1890s. At that point, Broadway shows featuring women began to include cakewalks, and grotesque dances became very popular across the country.

The fluid and graceful steps of the dance may have given rise to the colloquialism that something accomplished with ease is a "cakewalk".

As a plantation dance

Firsthand accounts
The cakewalk was influenced by the ring shout, which survived from the 18th into the 20th century.
There is extensive first-person testimony from emancipated slaves about the culture and dancing they developed among themselves on the plantations, including the dances that developed into the cakewalk. Louise Jones spoke of "Sech dancin' you never seen before. Slaves would set de flo' in turns, an' do de cakewalk mos' all night." Georgia Baker said that she sang cakewalk songs as a child, and was amused that as an adult, she "would be cakewalkin' to de same song." Estella Jones described nighttime parties with elaborate dress, some of which were attended by the slaveowners, who would judge the dancing and award cakes to the winners.

Secondhand, oral-tradition accounts
James Weldon Johnson, born in 1871, recounted a cakewalk at a ball in his 1912 novel The Autobiography of an Ex-Colored Man.

Some secondhand accounts of the cakewalk describe it as a subtle mockery of the formal, mannered dancing practiced by slaveholding whites. The slaves would dress in handed-down finery and comically exaggerate the poised movements of minuets and waltzes. These accounts describe any slaveowners in attendance as unaware that they were being mocked. One man recalled such a dance that his childhood nanny had described to him: "Sometimes the white folks noticed it, but they seemed to like it; I guess they thought we couldn't dance any better." A 1981 article by Brooke Baldwin concludes that the cakewalk was meant "to satirize the competing culture of supposedly 'superior' whites. Slaveholders were able to dismiss its threat in their own minds by considering it as a simple performance which existed for their own pleasure".

Entertainer Tom Fletcher, born in 1873, wrote in 1954 that his grandparents told him about the chalk-line walk/cakewalk as a child, but had no information about its origins. In their version, "there was no prancing, just a straight walk on a path made by turns and so forth, along which the dancers made their way with a pail of water on their heads. The couple that was the most erect and spilled the least water or no water at all was the winner." He describes it being "revived with fancy steps by Charlie Johnson, a clever eccentric dancer" and becoming known as the "Cake Walk".

Alternative explanations 
It has been suggested that the cakewalk originated in Florida, with the war dances of the Seminole Tribe. Ethel L. Urlin, writing in the book Dancing, Ancient and Modern (1912), described these dances as consisting of "wild and hilarious jumping and gyrating, alternating with slow processions in which the dancers walked solemnly in couples," which he believed grew into the cakewalk style. The Encyclopedia of Social Dance echoed this, stating that the dance spread from Florida to Georgia, the Carolinas, Virginia, and eventually New York, with the development of Florida into a winter tourist destination in the 1880s.

The authors of Jazz Dance: The Story of American Vernacular Dance reported that an informal experiment with African dancers undertaken in the 1950s turned up "no worthy African counterpart" to the Cakewalk. The same book noted eyewitness reports of dances from South Africa, Ghana, and Nigeria that bore a resemblance to the Cakewalk, with no elaboration.

Cakewalk in minstrelsy, musicals, and as a popular dance
Amiri Baraka in Blues People explained the strangeness of a slave dance covertly mocking white slaveholders that later was adopted by whites unaware of the mockery: "If the cakewalk is a Negro dance caricaturing certain white customs, what is that dance, when, say, a white theater company attempts to satirize it as a Negro dance? I find the idea of white minstrels in blackface satirizing a dance satirizing a dance satirizing themselves a remarkable kind of irony—which, I suppose, is the whole point of minstrel shows."

An exhibit at the 1876 Philadelphia Centennial featured Black people singing folk songs and doing an old dance called the "chalk-line walk" in a plantation-like setting. The dance was "done in the original fashion", as described by Fletcher.

In 1877, performer-showmen Harrigan and Hart produced "Walking for Dat Cake, An Exquisite Picture of Negro Life and Customs" as a feature sketch at New York's Theater Comique on lower Broadway.

Thereafter it was performed in minstrel shows, exclusively by men until the 1890s. In the 1893 production of The Creole Show, which ran from 1889 to 1897, Dora Dean and her husband Charles E. Johnson were a hit with their specialty, a cakewalk danced as partners. Their production had an African-American cast, and featured women dancing, which was revolutionary for the time. The inclusion of women "made possible all sorts of improvisations in the Walk, and the original was soon changed into a grotesque dance" which became very popular across the country.

A Grand Cakewalk was held in Madison Square Garden, the largest commercial venue in New York City, on February 17, 1892.

The Illustrated London News carried an 1897 report of a cakewalk at a barn dance in Ashtabula, Ohio, written by an English woman traveler. This version was more of a procession and less of a dance: "Just before the ball was declared finished a long procession of couples was formed who walked in their very best manner around the room three times before the criticizing eyes of a dozen old people, who selected the best turned-out pair, and gravely presented them with a large plum cake.

In July 1898, the musical comedy Clorindy, or The Origin of the Cake Walk opened on Broadway in New York. Will Marion Cook wrote ragtime music for the show. Black dancers mingled with white cast members for the first instance of integration on stage in New York. According to Cook, the show was a resounding success: "My chorus sang like Russians, dancing meanwhile like Negroes, and cakewalking like angels, black angels! When the last note was sounded, the audience stood and cheered for at least ten minutes. This was the finale which Witmark had said no one would listen to. It was pandemonium .... But did that audience take offense at my rags and lack of conducting polish? Not so you could notice it!"

"Dusky troopers march & cake walk" was written by Will Hardy and published in 1900.

Scott Joplin mentioned the cake walk in his folk ballet The Ragtime Dance, published in 1902.
Let me see you do the rag-time dance,
Turn left and do the cakewalk prance,
Turn the other way and do the slow drag –
Now take your lady to the World's Fair
And do the rag-time dance.

 The French music hall singer and dancer Eugénie Fougère was filmed in 1899 in the rag-time cake-walk "Hello, Ma Baby," with which she made a sensation at the New York Theatre. She is said to have introduced the dance in Paris (France) in 1900 in the Théâtre Marigny after she returned from a tour in the United States. The ambiguous "cake walk" became very popular quickly and Fougère appeared on the 18 October 1903 cover of Paris qui Chante dancing to the song Oh ! ce cake-walk.

Performances of the "Cake Walk", including a "Comedy Cake Walk" were filmed by the American Mutoscope and Biograph Company in 1903. Prancing steps were the main steps shown in the "Cake Walk" segment, which featured two couples, and a solo dancer. All dancers were African-American. 1903 was the same year that both the cakewalk and ragtime music arrived in Buenos Aires, Argentina, which may have influenced early styles of tango.

"Cakewalk King" Charles E. Johnson, who, with his wife Dora Jean, achieved fame cakewalking throughout the United States and Europe described his kind of dance as "simple, dignified and well-dressed".

Cakewalk as a musical form

Most cakewalk music is notated in  time signature with two alternate heavy beats per bar, giving it an oompah rhythm. The music was adopted into the works of various composers, including Robert Russell Bennett, John Philip Sousa, Claude Debussy and Louis Moreau Gottschalk. Debussy wrote "Golliwogg's Cake-walk" as the final movement of his Children's Corner suite for piano (published 1908), and The Little Nigar, subtitled A Cakewalk, for a piano method in 1909. The Cake Walk dance originated from the two-step, a dance which was itself spawned by the popularity of Sousa's marches. Although it featured more improvisation than the two-step, it was still very formal compared to later African-American dances such as the Charleston, Black Bottom and Lindy Hop.

Cakewalk music incorporated polyrhythm, syncopation, and the habanera rhythm into the regular march rhythm.

Modern times

The American English term "cakewalk" was used as early as 1863 to indicate something that is very easy or effortless, although this metaphor may refer to the carnival game of the same name in referring to the fact that the latter's winners obtain their prize by doing no more than walking around in a circle. Though the dance itself could be physically demanding, it was generally considered a fun, recreational pastime, covertly mocking slaveholder dance parties. The phrase "takes the cake" also comes from this practice, as could "piece of cake."

One version of the cakewalk is sometimes taught, performed included in competitions within the Scottish-inspired Highland dance community, especially in the southern United States.  In 2021, the Royal Scottish Official Board of Highland Dancing ruled to remove the dance from competition on the basis that it was derogatory to persons of color.

A version of the cakewalk seen in vintage film clips from the early 1900s is kept alive in the Lindy hop community through performances by the Hot Shots and through cakewalk classes held in conjunction with Lindy Hop classes and workshops.

Judy Garland and Margaret O'Brien perform a cakewalk in the 1944 MGM musical Meet Me in St. Louis.

Fairground ride
The original cakewalk dance inspired a fairground ride. The ride consists of two sides, customers walk along one side, around the end and back down the other. Each side has a central bridge mounted on cranks which give it an up and down motion as well as to and fro. On each end of the bridge section is a gangway and sliding platform. The British rides were often given an American name such as "Old Tyme Brooklyn Cakewalk" or "American Cakewalk" or variations thereon.

The first cakewalk ride is believed to have been built by Plimson and Taylor in 1895. Traditional cakewalks had an organ attached and on some of them if the organ sped up the walk also speed up.  Cakewalks, or to be precise the "dancing" customers, were considered to be good spectacle which drew in more potential customers.

Notes

References

 
 Gordon, Rae Beth (2009). Dances With Darwin, 1875-1910: Vernacular Modernity in France, Farnham: Ashgate Publishing,

External links

 Extraordinary Story Of Why A 'Cakewalk' Wasn't Always Easy at NPR
 Cakewalks in the Ragtime Era
 Britannica Brief article on the cakewalk
 Online Cake Walk Sheet Music
 article on Cakewalk at BasinStreet.com
 Cakewalk and Ragtime composer Arthur Pryor at BasinStreet.com
 

Dances of the United States
Ragtime
African-American dance
Blackface minstrelsy
Dance terminology